Long Wei (born 22 January 1995 in Wuhan) is a Chinese professional football player who currently is for free agent as a defender or defensive midfielder.

Club career
In 2014, Long Wei started his professional footballer career with Wuhan Zall in the China League One. On 14 July 2016, Long signed for Chinese Super League side Henan Jianye. On 16 July 2016, Long made his debut for Henan in the 2016 Chinese Super League against Chongqing Lifan. After several seasons at the club he was unable to establish himself within the team and joined second tier club Zhejiang Pro on 15 January 2020 on a free transfer. He would make his debut in a league game on 12 September 2020 against Guizhou in a 1-1 draw. He would then play a vital part as the club gained promotion to the top tier at the end of the 2021 campaign.

Career statistics 
Statistics accurate as of match played 31 January 2023.

References

External links
 

1995 births
Living people
Chinese footballers
Footballers from Wuhan
Wuhan F.C. players
Henan Songshan Longmen F.C. players
Zhejiang Professional F.C. players
China League One players
Chinese Super League players
Association football defenders
21st-century Chinese people